Peremyshlsky (masculine), Peremyshlskaya (feminine), or Peremyshlskoye (neuter) may refer to:
Peremyshlsky District, a district of Kaluga Oblast, Russia
Peremyshlsky (family), a princely family of Rurikid stock